Saint Bertha or Saint Aldeberge (c. 565 – d. in or after 601) was the queen of Kent whose influence led to the Christianization of Anglo-Saxon England. She was canonized as a saint for her role in its establishment during that period of English history.

Life
Bertha was a Frankish princess, the daughter of Charibert I and his wife Ingoberga, granddaughter of the reigning King Chlothar I and great-granddaughter of Clovis I and Saint Clotilde. Her father died in 567, her mother in 589. Bertha had been raised near Tours. Her marriage to the pagan Æthelberht of Kent, in 580 AD, was on condition that she be allowed to practice her religion. She brought her chaplain, Liudhard, with her to England. A former Roman church was restored for Bertha just outside the City of Canterbury, and dedicated to Saint Martin of Tours. It was the private chapel of Queen Bertha before Augustine arrived from Rome. The present St Martin's Church continues on the same site, incorporating Roman walling of the original church in the chancel. It is acknowledged by UNESCO as the oldest church in the English-speaking world where Christian worship has taken place continuously since 580 AD. St Martin's (with Canterbury Cathedral and St Augustine's Abbey) make up Canterbury's UNESCO World Heritage site.

Pope Gregory the Great  sent a Mission led by Augustine of Canterbury, to restore Christianity to England in 596. The Mission's favourable reception upon arrival in 597 AD owed much to the influence of Bertha.
Without her support and Æthelberht's good will, monastic settlements and the cathedral would likely have been developed elsewhere.  In 601, Pope Gregory addressed a letter to Bertha, in which he complimented her highly on her faith and knowledge of letters.

Anglo-Saxon records indicate that Saint Bertha had two children: Eadbald of Kent, and Æthelburg of Kent. She is named in the genealogies of various of the medieval accounts of the 'Kentish Royal Legend'.

The date of her death (possibly 606) is disputed.

Legacy
The city of Canterbury celebrates Queen Bertha in many ways.
 The Bertha trail, consisting of 14 bronze plaques set in pavements, runs from the Buttermarket to St Martin's church via Lady Wootton's Green.
 In 2006, bronze statues of Bertha and Ethelbert were installed on Lady Wootton's Green as part of the Canterbury Commemoration Society's "Ethelbert and Bertha" project. 
 There is a wooden statue of Bertha inside St Martin's church.

References

External links
 

541 births
580 deaths
Merovingian dynasty
Anglo-Saxon royal consorts
6th-century English people
7th-century English people
Kentish saints
Christian royal saints
Roman Catholic royal saints
7th-century Frankish saints
Gregorian mission
Christian female saints of the Middle Ages
6th-century English women
7th-century English women
Frankish princesses
Daughters of kings